Pircahan is a village in the Lachin District of Azerbaijan.

History 
The village was located in the Armenian-occupied territories surrounding Nagorno-Karabakh, coming under the control of ethnic Armenian forces during the First Nagorno-Karabakh War in the early 1990s. The village subsequently became part of the breakaway Republic of Artsakh as part of its Kashatagh Province, referred to as Goghtanik. It was returned to Azerbaijan as part of the 2020 Nagorno-Karabakh ceasefire agreement.

Historical heritage sites 
Historical heritage sites in and around the village include the bridge of Kotrats, a 12th-century khachkar, a 13th-century khachkar, a 17th/18th-century khachkar, and an 18th-century khachkar.

Demographics 
The village had 86 inhabitants in 2005, and 103 inhabitants in 2015.

References

External links 
 

Populated places in Lachin District